La Litanie des Cendres is the second full-length album by the French doom metal/gothic metal band Angellore. The title is French for 'the litany of the ashes'. The album was released both in a digital version and CD through Shunu Records on 21 August 2015. The CD version features a special digipak design and cards instead of a booklet.
Produced by Angellore and Florent Krist, it was mastered by Markus Skroch from the Kalthallen Studios (Germany). The layout and design is by Florent Castellani.

Track listing

Personnel

Angellore
 Rosarius – Electric & acoustic guitars, bass guitars, vocals, keyboards
 Walran – Vocals, keyboards
 Ronnie – Drums

Session members
 Lucia - Vocals
 Catherine Arquez – violin

References

External links
 

2015 albums
Angellore albums